Reddiar (also spelt as Reddiyar) is a Telugu speaking land owning, merchants , agricultural social group in Tamil Nadu and Pondicherry.

Reddiars, Reddy, Reddappa are considered and believed to come from the same origins and they spread across the lands of Southern and Central India. They are the patrons/financial supporters of local temples in Tamil Region. The names have been believed to be derived according to the regions they are spread across. Reddy in Andhra Pradesh and Telangana, Reddiar (Reddy + ar) in Tamil Nadu, Pondicherry, and Kerala. Reddy, Reddappa (Reddy + appa- signifying respect) in Karnataka.

Many Reddiars moved from the Andhra region in search of rich soil for cultivation and settled in Pondicherry and the northern districts of Cuddalore, Villupuram and Chengalpet in Tamil Nadu during Vijayanagar Empire. (In People of India/Indian Communities, Oxford University Press).

The migration of the Reddys/Reddiars to Tamil Nadu is assumed to have occurred during the Reddy dynasty expansion till Kanchipuram areas.

Following are the districts that have significant Reddiar Population.
Chennai, Tiruvallur, Kanchipuram, Chengalpattu, Ranipet, Vellore, Thirupattur, Thiruvannamalai, Krishnagiri, Dharmapuri, Puducherry, Cuddalore, Villupuram, Kallakurichi, Salem, Erode, Tiruppur, Coimbatore, Karur, Perambalur, Tiruchirappalli, Dindigul, Madurai, Virudhunagar, Thoothukudi and Tirunelveli

Origins

Anavota Reddy (1335-1364 CE) of Reddy dynasty extended the dominion of the kingdom to Rajahmundry on the north, Kanchi on the south and Srisailam on the west. In a battle at Vallioor, Reddiapuram army defeated Travancore army in the 14th century. In an information Board at the entrance of the Vallioor Murugan Temple it is stated that 14th century Vallioor War - Reddiapuram army defeated Travancore Army at vallioor Battle. After this war Reddiars settled at Samugarengapuram, Seelathikulam and all over Tirunelveli Region in the 14th century.

A mural at the Tiruppudaimaruthur temple in Tirunelveli district in Tamil Nadu, shows the emissaries of the Vijayanagara king Achyutadeva Raya serving an ultimatum to the Travancore ruler Bhoothala Veera Udaya Marthanda Varma to pay tributes to him and return the Pandya territory to Sri Vallabhan. It also depicts the battle between the armies of Achyutadeva Raya and Bhoothala Varma.They are believed moved into Tamil Nadu with the Vijayanagara Emperor Kumara Kampana to liberate Madurai [Madura Vijayam] from Islamic rule and expansion of Vijayanagar empire along with other Telugu and Kannada origin social groups.

Diaspora

Through emigration, there are now many Reddiars in the United States, South Africa, Singapore, Australia and United Kingdom. Many were brought to South Africa during British colonial era to work on the sugarcane farms as indentured labourers. The descendants of such Reddiars can still be found in South Africa today.

Reddy versus Reddiars

Reddys predominantly Telugu and follow Telugu cultural norms like Ugadi, Dussehra and Sankranthi and follow all other Andhra norms. Whereas Reddiars who came from Andhra to the Tamil region speak both Tamil and Telugu follow both Tamil and Telugu cultural norms. They also celebrate Thai Pongal, Tamil New Year and Ugadi. Some have represented in Tamil literary circles as great patrons and scholars of Tamil language.

Prominent Reddiars
 A. Subbarayalu Reddiar - First Chief Minister of Madras Presidency - Dec 1920 - June 1921
 V. Venkatasubha Reddiar - Former Chief Minister of Puducherry and a prominent Puducherry freedom fighter
 Muthulakshmi Reddi, First Indian Woman Doctor and Former Legislator, Founder of Cancer Institute (WIA),Padma Bhushan Awardee 
 O. P. Ramaswamy Reddiyar - Former Premier of Madras Presidency - 1947-1949 , Former Member of Legislative Council from 1946 to 1958
 Muthukumarappa Reddiar - Freedom Fighter, who spearheaded the revolution to allow Puducherry to join with Indian Union
 Purushothama Reddiar R.L - Freedom Fighter who organized and presided over the French India People’s Convention in 1947 which fought for the conditional withdrawal of the French Regime.
 V. Vaithilingam - Former Chief Minister of Puducherry - July 4, 1991 to May 13, 1996 (first term), September 4, 2008 – April 13, 2011, Member of Parliament from Puducherry Constituency, 2019 - 
 M. D. R. Ramachandran - Former Chief Minister of Puducherry - 16 January 1980 to 23 June 1983 and 8 March 1990 – 3 March 1991
 K. S. Venkatakrishna Reddiar - Politician, President of Congress Reform Committee
 M. R. Lakshmi Narayanan - Former Member of Parliament, Tindivanam from 15 March 1971 to 18 January 1977 and 23 March 1977 to 22 August 1979
 Jayarama Reddiar - Former Member of Legislative Council from 1952 to 1958
N. Krishnaswami Reddy - Former Justice of Madras High Court from 1964 to 1966.
 K. K. S. S. R. Ramachandran - Former Co-operation, PWD Minister in MGR Cabinet, Former Minister for Backward Classes (2006-2011), Minister for Revenue and Disaster Management in DMK Cabinet (2021-)
 K. N. Nehru - Former Minister for Electricity (1989-1991),Former Minister for Food & Public Distribution System (1996–2001), Former Transport Minister in DMK cabinet (2006–2011), Minister For Municipal Administration and Urban and Water Supply (2021-) in DMK cabinet
 Napoleon - Actor and Former MP of Perambalur Constituency Former Central Minister Of State for Social Justice and Empowerment, 2009 - 2013, Former Vice-President of Nadigar Sangam
P. Balakrishna Reddy - Former Animal Husbandry Minister and Former Youth Welfare and Sports Development Minister of Tamil Nadu , 2016 - 2019
S. R. Vijayakumar - Former Member of Parliament, Chennai Central Constituency, 2014 - 2019
R. Ramanathan - Former Member of Puducherry Legislative Assembly, Kuruvinatham Constituency, 1985 - 1991
 R. Radhakrishnan (politician) - Former Member of Parliament, Puducherry,2014 to 2019, Former Member of Puducherry Legislative Assembly, Kuruvinatham Constituency, 2001 - 2011
R. Senthilkumar - Member of Legislative Assembly of Puducherry,  Bahour Constituency, 2021 - 
  R. Girirajan - Member of Parliament, Rajya Sabha , 2022 - 
 V. Muthukumar  - Former Member of Legislative Assembly, Vridhachalam, 2011 to 2016
 Jayarama Reddiar - Former Member of Legislative assembly from Aruppukottai constituency in 1952
M. G. Sankar - Former Member of Legislative Assembly from Nanguneri Constituency, 1952 - 1962 , Philanthropist
P. S. Muthuselvan - Former Member of Legislative Assembly from Musiri Constituency, 1967 - 1976
 S. R. Raja - Member of Legislative Assembly from Tambaram Constituency,  2016 - 
 M. Varalakshmi - Member of Legislative Assembly from Chengalpattu Constituency,  2016 - 
  G. V. Markandayan - Member of Legislative Assembly from Vilathikulam Constituency, 2011 - 2016 , 2021 - 
 M. Sivasankar - Member of Legislative Assembly of Puducherry,  Ozhukarai Constituency, 2021 - 
 R. B. Ashok Babu - Nominated Member of Legislative Assembly of Puducherry, 2021 - 
 K. Uma Maheswari - Former Member of Legislative Assembly from Vilathikulam Constituency, 2016 - 2019
 P. Chinnappan - Former Member of Legislative Assembly from Vilathikulam Constituency, 2019 - 2021
 A. Pappasundaram -  Former Member of the Legislative Assembly of Tamil Nadu from Kulithalai Constituency,1989 - 1996, 2001 - 2006 , 2011 - 2016
 S. Raja Reddy - Former Member of the Legislative Assembly of Tamil Nadu from Thalli Constituency , 1996 - 2001
 S.Kathiravan - Member of Legislative Assembly, Manachanallur Constituency, 2021 -
 T. Venkatapathi Reddiar -Horticulturist, Padma Shri awardee
 C. V. Sridhar - Film director
 Annamalai Reddiyar - Tamil Poet
 G. R. Vaishnav - Indian Volleyball Player
R. K. Perumal - Former Member of Legislative Assembly from Vilathikulam Constituency,1977 - 1984
K.M.Adimoolam - Prominent Artist
Vasanth Ravi - Tamil Flim Actor
R. Venkatasubbu  Reddiar - Former Member of Parliament,Tindivanam from 1962 to 1967 
Manickavasaga Reddiar - Former Member of Puducherry from Mannadipet Assembly Constituency from 1964 to 1969
D.Ramachandira Reddiar - Former Member of Puducherry from Mannadipet Assembly Constituency from 1974 to 1980 
E.Ramar -  Former Member of the Legislative Assembly of Tamil Nadu from Kulithalai Constituency, 2016 - 2021 
A.Muthukrishnan - Co-Founder of Namma Veedu Vasanta Bhavan Chain of Restaurants , Tamil Nadu 
A.Rengasamy - Co-Founder of Namma Veedu Vasanta Bhavan Chain of Restaurants , Tamil Nadu 
M.Ravi - Owner of Namma Veedu Vasanta Bhavan Chain of Restaurants , Tamil Nadu 
R.Kandasamy Reddiar - Founder of Valarmathi Hotels(Now Known as Temple City Group of Hotels), Madurai, Tamil Nadu 
Temple City Lakshamana Kumar - Owner of Temple City Group of Hotels, Madurai, Tamil Nadu 
R. Srinivasan - Tamil Nadu Bharatiya Janata Party General Secretary 
Trichy Velusamy - Indian National Congress Spokesperson 
Dhanalakshmi A. Srinivasan - Founder - Chancellor of Dhanalakshmi Group of Institutions 
S.T. Reddiar - Founder of ST Reddiar and Sons, Ernakulam , Kerala 
Veeraiah Reddiar - Founder of Seematti, One of the Big Textile and Silk Showrooms in Kerala. 
Aiyappa Reddiar - Founder of Aiyappas, Kottayam, Kerala 
K. Lakshmana Reddiar - Textile Tycoon, Founder of Parthas, Textile and Silk Showroom Chain, Kerala 
M. Venkatanarayana Reddiar - Textile Tycoon, Kerala 
Nataraja Reddiar - Founder of Famous Grand Sweets & Snacks, Chennai 
M. Vengadasubbu Reddiar - Founder of Darling Electronics 
K. Santhanam Reddiar - Founder of Sanco Trans Group, Chennai
K.R.V. Ganesan Reddiar - Founder of Aswins Sweets, Perambalur

See also
Tamil diaspora
List of Reddy dynasties and states

References

Telugu society
Tamil society
Indian surnames
Social groups of Tamil Nadu